Bogata is a city in Red River County, Texas, United States. The population was 1,074 at the 2020 census. The city was named after Bogotá, the capital of Colombia.

Geography

Bogata is located at  (33.470245, –95.214283).

Demographics

As of the 2020 United States census, there were 1,074 people, 480 households, and 285 families residing in the city.

As of the census of 2000, 1,396 people, 598 households, and 361 families resided in the city. The population density was 989.9 people per square mile (382.3/km2). There were 659 housing units at an average density of 467.3 per square mile (180.5/km2). The racial makeup of the city was 93.91% White American, 3.01% African American, 0.72% Native American, 1.36% from other races, and 1.00% from two or more races. Hispanics or Latinos of any race were 3.30% of the population.

Of the 598 households, 26.1% had children under the age of 18 living with them, 45.3% were married couples living together, 11.7% had a female householder with no husband present, and 39.5% were not families. About 37.1% of all households were made up of individuals, and 20.7% had someone living alone who was 65 years of age or older. The average household size was 2.22 and the average family size was 2.92.

In the city, the population was distributed as 22.1% under the age of 18, 6.8% from 18 to 24, 24.4% from 25 to 44, 20.8% from 45 to 64, and 25.8% who were 65 years of age or older. The median age was 43 years. For every 100 females, there were 84.7 males. For every 100 females age 18 and over, there were 82.7 males.

The median income for a household in the city was $22,969, and for a family was $28,828. Males had a median income of $21,786 versus $19,423 for females. The per capita income for the city was $14,126. About 16.9% of families and 19.8% of the population were below the poverty line, including 26.0% of those under age 18 and 23.4% of those age 65 or over.

Education
The City of Bogata is served by the Rivercrest Independent School District (Talco-Bogata Consolidated Independent School District prior to July 1999).

It previously maintained Bogata Elementary. The district began construction of the consolidated elementary on May 1, 2000 and the scheduled completion was in June 2001.

References

Cities in Texas
Cities in Red River County, Texas